Gondwana Station is a German Antarctic research station on Gerlache Inlet. It is operated by the Federal Institute for Geosciences and Natural Resources.

History 

The base was first established as a bivouac hut in 1983, but during 1988 and 1989, the station was extended.

References 

1983 establishments in Antarctica
Victoria Land
Science and technology in Antarctica